Michal Čajkovský (born 6 May 1992) is a Slovak professional ice hockey defenceman for HC Sibir Novosibirsk of the Kontinental Hockey League (KHL).

Playing career
Čajkovský made his European Elite debut during the 2009–10 season playing in the Slovak Extraliga with HC Slovan Bratislava. Undrafted,  Čajkovský played major junior hockey with the Kingston Frontenacs and the Ottawa 67's of the Ontario Hockey League.

He spent the 2013–14 season, his first professional North American season, in the ECHL with the Reading Royals, on loan from the Hershey Bears of the AHL. He scored an impressive 14 goals and 36 points in 66 games to earn a selection to the ECHL All-Rookie Team. Čajkovský was re-signed by the Bears to a second one-year contract on 15 August 2014.

On 19 June 2015, Čajkovský returned to Europe and signed a one-year contract with Czech Extraliga team, HC Sparta Praha. In the 2015–16 season, Čajkovský made an immediate impact from the blueline with Sparta, compiling 11 goals and 28 points in 49 games.

After signing an extension to continue with Praha in the 2016–17 season, Čajkovský continued his upward development leading the defense in scoring with 12 points in 19 games before he opted for a mid-season transfer, having gained the attention of Russian-based, Avtomobilist Yekaterinburg of the KHL on 27 November 2016.

After attending the Carolina Hurricanes' training camp on a try-out basis, the club signed Čajkovský to a one-year, two-way contract worth $650,000 on 27 September 2018. He was among the last cuts re-assigned to begin the 2018–19 season with AHL affiliate, the Charlotte Checkers. While a fixture on the Checkers blueline, Čajkovský recorded 4 points in 23 games without a recall to the Hurricanes. On 28 December 2018, Čajkovský was placed on unconditional waivers by the Hurricanes in order to mutually terminate his contract in order to return to Europe. He was soon signed to a two-year contract to resume play in the KHL with HC Dynamo Moscow.

International play

Čajkovský participated at the 2012 World Junior Ice Hockey Championships as a member of the Slovakia men's national junior ice hockey team.

Career statistics

Regular season and playoffs

International

Awards and honors

References

External links

1992 births
Living people
Avtomobilist Yekaterinburg players
Charlotte Checkers (2010–) players
HC Dynamo Moscow players
Hershey Bears players
Kingston Frontenacs players
Ice hockey players at the 2018 Winter Olympics
Ice hockey players at the 2022 Winter Olympics
Olympic ice hockey players of Slovakia
Medalists at the 2022 Winter Olympics
Olympic bronze medalists for Slovakia
Olympic medalists in ice hockey
Ottawa 67's players
Sportspeople from Skalica
Reading Royals players
HC Slovan Bratislava players
Slovak ice hockey defencemen
South Carolina Stingrays players
HC Sparta Praha players
HC Sibir Novosibirsk players
Slovak expatriate ice hockey players in the Czech Republic
Slovak expatriate ice hockey players in the United States
Slovak expatriate ice hockey players in Canada
Slovak expatriate ice hockey players in Russia